Lovell William Wooldridge (9 December 1901 – 15 December 1983) was an English cricketer.  He was born in Quetta, Balochistan which was then in the British Raj.  He was educated at Wellington College, Berkshire where he played for the college cricket team.

Wooldridge played for Devon in the 1926 Minor Counties Championship, making his debut against Monmouthshire.  He played four further matches for Devon in 1926, playing his final Championship match against Monmouthshire.  Later in 1926, Wooldridge returned to the British Raj, where he made his first-class debut for the Europeans (India) against the Marylebone Cricket Club.  Four years later he played two further first-class matches, one for the Europeans, which came against the Muslims and the other for the Punjab Governor's XI against the Muslims.  In his three first-class matches he scored 20 runs at a batting average of 5.00, with a high score of 18.  With the ball he took 5 wickets at a bowling average of 39.40, with best figures of 3/69.

He died in Exeter, Devon on 15 December 1983.

References

External links
Lovell Wooldridge at Cricinfo
Lovell Wooldridge at CricketArchive

1901 births
1983 deaths
People from Quetta
People educated at Wellington College, Berkshire
English cricketers
Devon cricketers
Europeans cricketers